Christian Greber (born 8 February 1972, in Mellau) is an Austrian former alpine skier who competed in the 2002 Winter Olympics.

External links
 sports-reference.com
 

1972 births
Living people
Austrian male alpine skiers
Olympic alpine skiers of Austria
Alpine skiers at the 2002 Winter Olympics
Sportspeople from Vorarlberg
People from Bregenz District